Timothy David Treloar is a Welsh actor. He is known for voicing the Third Doctor in the Big Finish Productions Doctor Who audio series and for playing Sergeant Major Tysoe in Bombshell. A well known stage actor, he has also appeared in several high-profile films including Maleficent, 100 Streets and Dolittle.

Career
Born in Bridgend, Wales, Treloar studied at LAMDA before earning his first screen role in Bomber in 2000 before working his way into becoming a regular actor seen on-screen. He then appeared in the film Wondrous Oblivion and then the television series Mine All Mine and Bombshell. Shortly after, Treloar appeared in two episodes of The Bill before appearing as a regular in both Casualty and Midsomer Murders as well as a role in one episode of A Touch of Frost. In 2010, Treloar played the main role of DS Simon Vedder in Silent Witness as well as playing a Norwegian terrorist in Mammon, following this with a part in Maleficent.

In 2015, Treloar began voicing the Third Doctor, previously played by Jon Pertwee, for the audio series of Doctor Who produced by Big Finish Productions, starring alongside original cast members including Katy Manning and Richard Franklin. Since then, Treloar has voiced the Third Doctor in eight volumes of audio adventures for the Doctor Who series, as well as voicing roles in Big Finish's series of Blake's 7, The Avengers and Survivors.

Treloar followed this with a two-episode stint in Doctors before starring in Crossing Lines, Dark Heart, Father Brown and Call the Midwife and also the film 100 Streets opposite Idris Elba. He also gained recognition appearing in the stage version of Birdsong as Jack Firebrace and later starred as the same role in the film version which was released in 2020. He also appeared in the film The Haunting of Alice Bowles with Tamzin Outhwaite in 2020 as well as writing and starring in his own internet comedy series entitled Peter Peter's Positivity Programme in which he played a hassled geography teacher. In March 2021, Treloar appeared in the first episode of ITV crime drama series Grace, as well as an episode of the BBC soap opera Doctors as Dave Conroy.

Filmography

Film

Television

Video games

References

External links
 

Living people
Welsh male soap opera actors
Welsh male stage actors
Welsh male television actors
Welsh male voice actors
Year of birth missing (living people)